Ron Miller (born May 8, 1947) is an illustrator and writer who lives and works in South Boston, Virginia. He now specializes in astronomical, astronautical and science fiction books for adults and young adults.

Miller was born in Minneapolis, Minnesota. He holds a BFA from Columbus, Ohio, College of Art and Design. He worked as a commercial artist and designer for six years, before taking a position as art director for the National Air and Space Museum's Albert Einstein Planetarium. He left there in 1977 to become a freelance illustrator and author; to date he has nearly sixty book titles to his credit, and his illustrations have appeared on hundreds of book jackets, book interiors and in magazines such as National Geographic, Reader's Digest, Scientific American, Smithsonian, Analog, Starlog, Air & Space, Astronomy, Sky & Telescope, Science et Vie, Newsweek, Natural History, Discover, GEO and others.

Miller has translated and illustrated new editions of Jules Verne's 20,000 Leagues Under the Sea, From the Earth to the Moon and Journey to the Center of the Earth as well as a companion/atlas to Verne's works, Extraordinary Voyages. He has acted as a consultant on Verne for Walt Disney Imagineering (for the Paris Disneyland) and A&E Television Network's Biography series. Miller's book The Dream Machines, a comprehensive 744-page history of crewed spacecraft, was nominated for the International Astronautical Federation's Manuscript Award and won the Booklist Editor's Choice Award. His original paintings are in numerous private and public collections, including the Smithsonian Institution and the Pushkin Museum (Moscow).

He designed a set of ten commemorative postage stamps for the U.S. Postal Service. One of the stamps in the Space Exploration series (1991), is credited with helping inspire the New Horizons mission to that planet. The Pluto stamp was attached to the spacecraft before launch. The stamp is now in the Guinness Book of World Records as having traveled further than any other postage stamp in history. He has been a production illustrator for motion pictures, notably Dune and an unproduced version of Total Recall; and he designed and co-wrote the computer-generated show ride film, Comet Impact! for SimEx. He has provided concept and special effects art for numerous other films. Most recently he was a co-producer of the documentary film, "A Brush With the Future."

Miller has taken part in international space art workshops and exhibitions, including seminal sessions held in Iceland and the Soviet Union. He was invited by the Soviet government to the 30th anniversary celebration of the launch of Sputnik, and has lectured on space art and space history in the United States, France, Japan, Italy and Great Britain. He was featured on Hour 25 Science Fiction Radio program in early 2003.

An authority on the work of astronomical artist Chesley Bonestell, his book The Art of Chesley Bonestell received a Hugo Award in 2002. A feature-length documentary based on this book, "A Brush With the Future," for which he was co-producer, won the Audience Award at the Newport Beach Film Festival and Best Documentary at the San Diego Comic Con. Other books have received awards, including a Silver Award for best fiction from ForeWord magazine for Palaces & Prisons  and the Violet Crown Award from the Writers' League of Texas for Bradamant. His Worlds Beyond series received the American Institute of Physics Award of Excellence.  The Grand Tour has gone through three editions, multiple printings, several translations, was a Hugo Award nominee and has sold over 250,000 copies. It was also twice a Book-of-the-Month feature selection. This and other books have been selections of the Science, Quality Paperback and Science Fiction Book Clubs. His book, Digital Art, was listed on the VOYA (Voice of Youth Advocates) Nonfiction Honor List in 2009. In all, he has 75 works in 142 publications in 6 languages in 16,977 libraries world-wide.

Miller has been on the faculty of the International Space University.

A recent project has been Black Cat Press, which Miller has devoted to publishing new editions of rare and obscure science fiction, fantasy and science fact books. Among these are new, original translations of several Jules Verne novels.

Published books

 The Space Art Poster Book (Stackpole, 1979)
 Space Art (Starlog, 1979)
 The Grand Tour (Workman, 1981; revised edition, 1993; revised edition, 2005) with William K. Hartmann
 Worlds Beyond: The Art of Chesley Bonestell (Donning, 1983) with Frederick C. Durant, III
 Out of the Cradle (Workman, 1984) with William K. Hartmann
 Cycles of Fire (Workman, 1987) with William K. Hartmann
 Stars and Planets (Doubleday, 1987) Illustrator
 Mathematics (illustrator: Doubleday, 1989) Illustrator
 20,000 Leagues Under the Sea (Unicorn, 1988) Illustrator and translator
 In the Stream of Stars (Workman, 1990) with William K. Hartmann; foreword by Ray Bradbury
 The Bronwyn Trilogy: Palaces & Prisons, Silk & Steel, Hearts & Armor (Ace, 1991–1992) Novels; rewritten and published as A Company of Heroes (Baen Books, 2014) along with the additional fourth and fifth volumes, The Scientist and The Space Cadet
 The History of Earth (Workman, 1992) with William K. Hartmann
 The Dream Machines (Krieger, 1993) Foreword by Arthur C. Clarke
 Extraordinary Voyages (Black Cat Press, 1994) Foreword by Forrest J. Ackerman
 BrainQuest (Workman, 1994)
 Firebrands (Paper Tiger, 1998) Illustrator
 20,000 Leagues Under the Sea (Dorling Kindersley, 1998) Adaptation
 The History of Rockets (Grolier, 1999)
 Bradamant (Timberwolf, 2000; revised edition issued as The Iron Tempest, Baen Books, 2014) Novel
 The History of Science Fiction (Grolier, 2001)
 The Art of Chesley Bonestell (Paper Tiger, 2001) with Frederick C. Durant, III, foreword by Arthur C. Clarke
 Mermaids & Meteors (Black Cat Press, 2005) Novel
 Velda (Timberwolf Press, 2003) Novel
 Worlds Beyond (twelve-book series, Millbrook Press, 2002–2005): Earth & Moon; Saturn; The Sun; Mars; Venus; Uranus & Neptune; Extrasolar Planets; Mercury & Pluto; Jupiter; Asteroids, Comets & Meteors; Stars & Galaxies
 Special Effects in the Movies (Millbrook Press, 2006)
 The Elements (Millbrook Press, 2004)
 13 Steps to Velda (Black Cat Press, 2005) Short story collection
 Captain Judikah (Black Cat Press, 2005) Novel (later, as The Space Cadet, made part of the Company of Heroes series published by Baen Books)
 Pathetic Selections (Black Cat Press, 2005) Editor
 Journey to the Center of the Earth (Barnes & Noble, 2009) Translator
 Space Innovations (four-book series, Lerner, 2007–2008): Rockets, Satellites, Robot Explorers, Space Exploration
 Extreme Aircraft (HarperCollins, 2007)
 Digital Art (Lerner, 2007)
 Cleopatra (Chelsea House, 2008) with Sommer Browning; foreword by Arthur M. Schlesinger, Jr.
 The Seven Wonders of Engineering (Lerner, 2009)
 The Seven Wonders of the Gas Giants (Lerner, 2010)
 The Seven Wonders Beyond the Solar System (Lerner, 2010)
 The Seven Wonders of the Rocky Planets (Lerner, 2010)
 The Seven Wonders of Comets, Asteroids and Meteors (Lerner, 2010)
 Is the End of the World Near? (Lerner, 2011)
 Journey to the Exoplanets (Farrar, Straus and Giroux, 2011) iPad book app; with Edward Bell
 Recentering the Universe (Lerner, 2013)
 Storm Chasers (Lerner, 2013)
 Exploring Mars (Lerner, 2013)
 The Art of Space (Zenith, 2014), forewords by Dan Durda and Caroline Porco
 Return to Skull Island (Baen Books, 2014) with Darrell Funk
 Velda: Girl Detective (Caliber Comics, 2015), 3-volume comic anthology
 Spaceships  (Smithsonian Books, 2016), forewords by Lance Bush and Tom Crouch
  The Zoomable Universe (Farrar, Straus and Giroux, 2017), illustrator
 Aliens: Past, Present, Future (Watkins Publishing, 2017), Author and illustrator
 Space Stations (Smithsonian Books, 2018), co-author, foreword by Nicole Stott
 The Beauty of Space (Springer Nature, 2020), co-editor and contributor
 Natural Satellites: The Book of Moons (Lerner, 2021)
 Envisioning Exoplanets (Smithsonian, 2020), illustrator
 Space Science and Public Engagement (Elsevier, 2021), contributor
 Alien Invasions (IDW, 2021), contributor
 The Big Backyard (Lerner, 2022)

Awards

Lucien Rudaux Memorial Award for Lifetime Achievement in Astronomical Art, IAAA, 2003
Frank R. Paul Award for Outstanding Achievement in Science Fiction Art, Nashville, 1988
Award of Merit, Art Director's Club of Washington, DC, 1981
Hugo Award for Best Related Work, 2002: The Art of Chesley Bonestell
Award of Excellence in Science Writing from American Institute of Physics, 2003: Worlds Beyond series
Nominee for 1982 Hugo Award for best nonfiction for The Grand Tour
Ten Best Books of the Year, 1984—Astronomical Society of the Pacific: Out of the Cradle
Ten Best Books of the Year, 1987—Astronomical Society of the Pacific: Cycles of Fire
Outstanding Science Trade Book, National Science Teachers Assoc./Children's Book Council, 1987: Stars and Planets
New York Public Library Books for the Teen Age, 1992:  The History of Earth
IAF Manuscript Award. Booklist Editor's Award, 1994: The Dream Machines
New York Public Library Books for the Teen Age, 2000: Rockets
Children's Book Committee at Bank Street College Best Children's Book of the Year, 2005:  Venus
National Science Teachers Association (NSTA) / Children's Book Council (CBC) Outstanding Science Trade Books for Students K-12, 2005: The Elements
VOYA (Voice of Youth Advocates) Nonfiction Honor List, 2009: Digital Art
2001 Writer's League of Texas Violet Crown Award for best audiofiction: Bradamant
2012 SSLI (Society of School Librarians International) Book Award, Honor Book in the Science 7-12 category: Is the End of the World Near? 
NSTA/CBC Outstanding Science Trade Books for Students K-12: The Elements
Junior Library Guild Selection; nominee for Library of Virginia Literary Award for Non-Fiction: Recentering the Universe
Best Children's Books of the Year, 2015, Children’s Book Committee at the Bank Street College of Education: Curiosity's Mission on Mars
Finalist, Locus Award for Best Art Book, 2014: The Art of Space
Ordway Award for Sustained Excellence in Spaceflight History, 2018
Audience Award, Newport Beach Film Festival, for "A Brush With the Future" (co-producer)
Best Documentary, San Diego Comic Con, for "A Brush With the Future" (co-producer)
Best Documentary, Boston Sci-Fi Film Festival, for "A Brush With the Future (co-producer)
Longlist for the 2019 AAAS/Subaru SB&F Prize for Excellence in Science Books, "Zoomable Universe"
2021 Joseph V. Canzani Alumni Award for Excellence (Columbus College of Art and Design)

References

External links
 
Online portfolio
 
 Galenet Listing
 Postage Stamp Designs for U.S. Postal Service
 Work on movie Dune
 Interview on Hour 25
 
 Interview at Republibot
 World Catalog entry
 
 
Chesley Bonestell documentary

1947 births
American illustrators
American science writers
American science fiction writers
Science fiction artists
Space artists
Artists from Minneapolis
People from South Boston, Virginia
Writers from Minneapolis
Living people
American male novelists
American male short story writers
20th-century American novelists
21st-century American novelists
20th-century American short story writers
21st-century American short story writers
20th-century American male writers
21st-century American male writers
Novelists from Minnesota
20th-century American non-fiction writers
21st-century American non-fiction writers
American male non-fiction writers